Ulster Publishing is a newspaper publisher in Kingston, New York, established in January 1972 by Geddy Sveikauskas.

Newspapers
Kingston Times, weekly,, through 2020
New Paltz Times , weekly, 2001-2020
Saugerties Times , weekly, 1996-2020
Woodstock Times, weekly, through 2020
Some of those newspapers either predate the Ulster Publishing company or the same name has been used for different publications.  An insert styled the "@lmanac" was included in each issue toward the end of the run.

Hudson Valley One
As a result of the worldwide pandemic which occurred in 2020, all printing of publications was stopped in March of that year.  When publication was resumed, all the earlier titles were replaced with a regional newspaper called Hudson Valley One.

References

External links
 Ulster Publishing

Publishing companies established in 1972
Mass media in Ulster County, New York
Newspaper companies of the United States